Knob Noster High School is an American public high school located in Knob Noster, Missouri. It is part of the Knob Noster R-VIII School District.

References

Sources 
 Official Website

Public high schools in Missouri
Schools in Johnson County, Missouri